Miss Innocence is a 1918 American silent drama film directed by Harry Millarde and starring June Caprice. It was produced and released by the Fox Film Corporation.

Cast
June Caprice as Dolores May
Marie Shotwell as Fay Gonard
Robert Walker as Henry Grant / Lawrence Grant
Frank Beamish as Kale Loomis
Carleton Macy as James Boyle
Elizabeth Garrison as Mrs. Grant (credited as Mrs. Garrison)

Preservation
With no prints of Miss Innocence in any film archives, it is a lost film.

References

External links

1918 films
American silent feature films
Lost American films
Fox Film films
Films directed by Harry F. Millarde
American black-and-white films
Silent American drama films
1918 drama films
1918 lost films
Lost drama films
1910s American films